Ariel Behar and Fabiano de Paula were the defending champions but chose to defend their title with different partners. Behar partnered Attila Balázs but lost in the semifinals to Marcelo Arévalo and Miguel Ángel Reyes-Varela. De Paula partnered Sergio Galdós but lost in the first round to Hugo Dellien and Federico Zeballos.

Arévalo and Reyes-Varela won the title after defeating Dellien and Zeballos 6–1, 6–7(7–9), [10–6] in the final.

Seeds

Draw

References
 Main Draw

Challenger Ciudad de Guayaquil - Doubles
2017 Doubles